Iteration means the act of repeating in the contexts of mathematics, computing and project management, particularly software development.

It can also refer to:

 Iterated function, in mathematics
 "Iteration", a song from Potemkin City Limits, the fourth full-length album by the punk rock band Propagandhi
 Iteration, a 2017 album by American electronic music producer Seth Haley, released under his alias Com Truise
 Iterations, a 2002 collection of short stories by Canadian science fiction author Robert J. Sawyer as well as the title of a story in that collection
 Iterative and incremental development, a term in new product development that came from software development
 Iterative aspect in linguistics